Wolfgang Böhm (born 16 September 1941) is an Austrian sailor. He competed in the Tempest event at the 1976 Summer Olympics.

References

External links
 

1941 births
Living people
Austrian male sailors (sport)
Olympic sailors of Austria
Sailors at the 1976 Summer Olympics – Tempest
Sportspeople from Vienna